Jacob Hersey Loud (February 5, 1802 – February 2, 1880) was a Massachusetts lawyer  and an American politician who served as a member of the Massachusetts House of Representatives, the Massachusetts Senate, for twenty two years as the Register of Probate for Plymouth County, Massachusetts, and twice as the Treasurer and Receiver-General of Massachusetts.

See also
 85th Massachusetts General Court (1864)

Notes

1802 births
Republican Party members of the Massachusetts House of Representatives
Republican Party Massachusetts state senators
Massachusetts lawyers
State treasurers of Massachusetts
People from Plymouth, Massachusetts
Brown University alumni
1880 deaths
19th-century American politicians
19th-century American lawyers